Valeria Salinas González (born ) is a Mexican female volleyball player. She is a member of the Mexico women's national volleyball team and played for Nuevo Leon in 2018. 

She was part of the Mexico national team at the 2017 FIVB Volleyball Girls' U18 World Championship, and 2018 FIVB Volleyball Women's World Championship.

Clubs 

  Nuevo Leon (2018)

References

External links 

 FIVB profile
 https://www.sport.de/volleyball/pe569549/valeria-salinas-gonzalez/

 http://www.norceca.net/2018%20Events/U20/P-2-3/P-3/P-3for%20match%204_%20MEX-HON.pdf

2000 births
Living people
Mexican women's volleyball players
Place of birth missing (living people)